Nelson Luiz Bittencourt Sardenberg (born August 1, 1970 in Belo Horizonte) is a Brazilian karate fighter.

In 1999, Nelson was defeated on the final of the 1999 Pan American Games in Winnipeg by the American John Fonseca.

In 2002, fighting for the Pan-American Championship, Nelson had his jaw broken and required a surgical intervention.

In 2003, Nelson was defeated by the American John Fonseca on the final of the 2003 Pan American Games in Santo Domingo.

References

1970 births
Living people
Brazilian male karateka
Karateka at the 2007 Pan American Games
Sportspeople from Belo Horizonte
Pan American Games silver medalists for Brazil
Pan American Games bronze medalists for Brazil
Pan American Games medalists in karate
Karateka at the 1999 Pan American Games
Karateka at the 2003 Pan American Games
Medalists at the 1999 Pan American Games
Medalists at the 2007 Pan American Games
20th-century Brazilian people
21st-century Brazilian people